The Tuscan fiorino (plural: fiorini) was the currency of Tuscany between 1826 and 1859. It was subdivided into 100 quattrini (singular: quattrino), a local currency made by four denari (from the Latin: quater denarii). There was an additional denomination called the paolo, worth 40 quattrini, in circulation.

History
During the Napoleonic Wars, Tuscany was annexed by France and the French franc was introduced, together with its satellite Italian lira. The previous lira did not disappear, creating a big confusion between the old Tuscan lira and the new Italian lira. So, when Duke Leopold II rose to power in 1824, he decided to introduce a new basic currency. The fiorino replaced the Tuscan lira at a rate of  lire = 1 fiorino. In 1847, Tuscany absorbed Lucca and the fiorino replaced the Luccan lira at a rate of 1 fiorino = 2 lire. After a brief revolutionary coinage, the fiorino was replaced in 1859 by a provisional currency denominated in "Italian lira", equal to the Sardinian lira, with 1 fiorino = 1.4 Italian lire.

Coins
Copper coins were struck in denominations of 1 and 3 quattrini, together with billon 5 and 10 quattrini, silver , 1 and 5 paolo, 1 and 4 fiorini. Gold coins included the sequin (Italian: zecchino), ruspone and 80 fiorini, the latter two equalled 3 and 10 sequins respectively.

References

External links

Currencies of Italy
Modern obsolete currencies
1826 establishments in Italy
1859 disestablishments
19th-century economic history
1826 establishments in the Grand Duchy of Tuscany